The Vienna Secession (also known as the Union of Austrian Artists, or Vereinigung Bildender Künstler Österreichs) is an art movement, closely related to Art Nouveau, that was formed in 1897 by a group of Austrian painters, graphic artists, sculptors and architects, including Josef Hoffman, Koloman Moser, Otto Wagner and Gustav Klimt. They resigned from the Association of Austrian Artists in protest against its support for more traditional artistic styles.  Their most influential architectural work was the Secession Building designed by Joseph Maria Olbrich as a venue for expositions of the group.  Their official magazine was called Ver Sacrum (Sacred Spring, in Latin), which  published highly stylised and influential works of graphic art.  In 1905 the group itself split, when some of the most prominent members, including  Klimt, Wagner, and Hoffmann, resigned in a dispute over priorities, but it continued to function, and still functions today, from its headquarters in the Secession Building. In its current form, the Secession exhibition gallery is independently led and managed by artists.

History

Founding
The Vienna Secession was founded on 3 April 1897 by artist Gustav Klimt, designer Koloman Moser, architects Josef Hoffmann and Joseph Maria Olbrich, Max Kurzweil, Wilhelm Bernatzik and others. The architect Otto Wagner joined the group shortly after it was founded.  The goals stated at the founding included establishing contact and an exchange of ideas with artists outside Austria, disputing artistic nationalism, renewing the decorative arts; creating a "total art",  that unified painting, architecture, and the decorative arts; and, in particular, opposing the domination of the official Vienna Academy of the Arts, the Vienna Künstlerhaus, and official art salons, with its traditional orientation toward Historicism.

The movement took its name from Munich Secession movement that was founded in 1892.  The goals of the new movement in Vienna were expressed by the literary critic  Hermann Bahr in the first issue of the new journal begun by the group, called Ver Sacrum ("Sacred Spring").  Bahr wrote, "Our art is not a combat of modern artists against those of the past, but the promotion of the arts against the peddlers who pose as artists and who have a commercial interest in not letting art bloom.  The choice between commerce and art is the issue at stake in our Secession. It is not a debate over aesthetics, but a confrontation between two different spiritual states."

At the beginning, the Secession had fifty members, and at its first elected the painter Gustav Klimt as its president. Other founding or early members included the architect Josef Hoffmann, the designer Koloman Moser, the designer and architect Joseph Maria Olbrich, and the painters Max Kurzweil and Alphonse Mucha, who resided in Paris and was already famous for his Art Nouveau posters.  The established painter Rudolf von Alt, eighty-five years old, was chosen as the Honorary President of the group, and he led a delegation with an invitation to the Emperor Franz-Joseph to attend the first Exposition.

The first architectural project of the Secession was the creation of an exhibit space which would introduce international artists and art movements to Vienna. The architect was Joseph Maria Olbrich, a student of Otto Wagner;  and his domed gallery building, with a sculptural frieze over the entrance, in the center of Vienna, became the symbol of the movement.  It was the first dedicated gallery of contemporary art in the city. This helped make the French Impressionists and others familiar to the Viennese public.

The 14th Secession exhibition in 1902, designed by Josef Hoffmann and dedicated to Ludwig van Beethoven, was especially famous. A statue of Beethoven by Max Klinger stood at the center, with Klimt's Beethoven frieze mounted around it. The Klimt frieze has been restored and can be seen in the gallery today.

Split within the Secession
In 1899, Olbrich left Vienna to join the Darmstadt Artists’ Colony. In 1900, he obtained Hessian citizenship and did not work in Austria again.

In 1903, Hoffmann and Moser founded the Wiener Werkstätte as a fine-arts society with the goal of reforming the applied arts (arts and crafts). In 1907, Wiener Werkstätte and Hoffmann personally became founding members of Deutscher Werkbund.

An important division soon emerged inside the Secession between those who wished to give precedence to the painters and the traditional fine arts, and others, including Klimt, Hoffmann, Wagner, Moser and others who favored equal treatment for the decorative arts.  This dispute came to a head in 1905 when a prominent painter in the group, Carl Moll, proposed  that the Secession purchase the Gallery Miethke, as an outlet for its work.  This was supported by Klimt, Wagner, Hoffmann, Moser, and others.  The issue was put to a vote by the members, and Klimt and his supporters lost by a single vote.  On June 14, 1905, Klimt, Hoffmann, Moser and a group of other artists resigned from the Secession.

Later years
The Secession continued to function after the departure of Klimt, Hoffmann, Wagner and their supporters, giving regular exhibitions in the Secession building, but they lacked the originality and excitement of the earlier period. The designer Peter Behrens became a member of the Secession in 1938. Under the regime of the Nazi Party the Secession building was destroyed as a symbol of degenerate art, but was faithfully reconstructed following World War II.

In 1945, following the War, Hoffmann rejoined the Vienna Secession, the artistic movement from which he, Klimt and Wagner had dramatically quit in 1905. He was elected President of the Secession from 1948 to 1950.  The Secession continues to function today, holding regular exhibitions in the Secession Hall.

Genres of Art

Painting and Graphic Arts

Architecture
Along with painters and sculptors, several prominent architects were associated the Vienna Secession, most notably Joseph Maria Olbrich, Otto Wagner and Josef Hoffmann.  In 1897-98 Olbrich designed the Secession Building to display the art of Klimt and the members of the group, and also by foreign artists, including Max Klinger, Eugène Grasset, Charles Rennie Mackintosh, and Arnold Bocklin.  Josef Hoffmann became the principal designer of exhibitions at the Secession House. The dome and stylized facade became a symbol of the movement.

A group of artists including Koloman Moser, Othmar Schimkowitz, Jože Plečnik, and others, under the direction of  architect  Otto Wagner,  decorated two apartment buildings Wagner designed;  the Linke Wienzeile Buildings in 1898–1899. The building at  Linke Wienzeile 40 is known as Majolikahaus or Majolica House.  Its facade is entirely covered with majolica, or colorful fired clay tiles in floral designs. The Art Nouveau ornaments of its facade was done  by his student .  The other building, Linke Wienzeile 38, is known as House with medallions because of its decor of gilded stucco medallions by Wagner's student and frequent collaborator, Koloman Moser. The most ornate earlier decoration was removed but later restored.

During this period, Otto Wagner also built extraordinarily stylized stations for the new Vienna urban transport system, the Stadtbahn, which also became the symbols of the Secession style.  The most famous of these is the Karlsplatz Stadtbahn Station in the center of Vienna, Joseph Maria Olbrich was his collaborator for this project.  The style of these buildings marked a transition toward more geometric forms, and the beginnings of modernism.

Wagner's later buildings built after 1899, including the Church of St. Leopold (1902–1907) and especially the Austrian Postal Savings Bank (1903–1906, extended at 1910–12), had straight lines and geometric forms, a striking use of new materials, such reinforced concrete and aluminum, and a minimum of decoration on the facade or inside.

The work of Josef Hoffmann also showed a gradual transition away from floral designs and curving lines. His best-known building, the Palais Stoclet in Brussels, had a tower of stacked cubic forms, minimum ornament on the facade, and an interior of right angles and geometric designs. The only Art Nouveau elements were the murals by Gustav Klimt.  The Palais Stoclet best illustrated Hoffmann's transition from Art Nouveau toward modernism.

Furniture
Secession architects often designed furniture to accompany their architectural projects, along with carpets, lamps, wallpaper, and even bathroom fixtures and even towels.  The furniture presented by the Secession at the 1900 Paris Universal Exposition was particularly praised, and won international attention for its creators, including Else Unger and Emilio Zago.

Later in the movement, in 1902, the architect Otto Wagner designed chairs using modern materials, including aluminum, combined with wood, to match the architecture of his Austrian Postal Savings Bank building.  In 1905 Josef Hoffmann produced an adjustable-backed chair which reflected the more geometric forms of the late Secession.

Glass
Glass, particularly stained glass windows, played a significant part in the Vienna Secession. Leopold Forstner was in important artist in this domain, working closely with Otto Wagner and other architects.  He designed the windows for the Austrian Postal Savings Bank, one of the landmarks of the Vienna Secession style, and also for the St. Charles Borromeo Cemetery Church, the most notable of Vienna Secession churches.

Another notable figure in Secession glass art was Johann Loetz Witwe, who made a striking series of iridescent vases which won a gold medal at the 1900 Paris Exposition.

Ceramics
Mosaics of ceramic tiles were another important element of the Vienna Secession style.  They were used to decorate both building facades and interiors.   Otto Wagner used them to decorate the Majolika House, where they served both as decoration and for a practical purpose;  the facade could be efficiently cleaned with the use of fire hoses.

Other genres

Influence

Vienna Secession also influenced the Polish movement Młoda Polska (Young Poland), that was also inclusive of other than Art Nouveau artistic styles and encompassed a broader approach to art, literature, and lifestyle.

Vienna Secession influenced not only movements but also particular architects, e.g. Russian Illarion Ivanov-Schitz who created his own unique style on its base.

From the mid-1890s onwards, Mintons in England made major contributions to Art Nouveau ceramics, many designed by Marc-Louis Solon's son Leon Solon and his colleague John Wadsworth. Leon Solon was hired by Mintons after his work was published in the hugely influential design magazine The Studio and he worked for the company from 1895 to 1905, including a brief stint as Art Director.  Solon introduced designs influenced by the Vienna Secession, and a range in earthenware made from about 1901 to 1916 was branded as "Secessionist Ware".  It was made mostly using industrial techniques that kept it relatively cheap, and was aimed at a broad market.  The range concentrated on items bought singly or in pairs, such as jugs or vases, rather than full table services.

Commemoration

The Secession movement was selected as the theme for an Austrian commemorative coin: the 100 euro Secession commemorative coin minted on 10 November 2004.

On the obverse side there is a view of the Secession exhibition hall in Vienna. The reverse side features a small portion of the Beethoven Frieze by Gustav Klimt. The extract from the painting features three figures: a knight in armor representing Armed Strength, one woman in the background symbolizing Ambition and holding up a wreath of victory, and a second woman representing Sympathy with lowered head and clasped hands.

On the obverse side of the Austrian € 0,50 or 50 euro-cent coin, the Vienna Secession Building figures within a circle, symbolising the birth of the movement and a new age in the country.

Other Secession artists
Artists of Vienna Secession not mentioned above are:

 Teodor Axentowicz
 Renate Bertlmann
 Adolf Michael Boehm
 Julian Fałat
 Wlastimil Hofman
 Maximilian Liebenwein
 Jacek Malczewski
 Julius Mayreder
 Emilie Mediz-Pelikan
 Józef Mehoffer
 Carl Moll
 Maximilian Pirner
 Kazimierz Pochwalski
 Teresa Feoderovna Ries
 Jan Stanisławski
 Wacław Szymanowski
 Wojciech Weiss
 Leon Wyczółkowski
 Stanisław Wyspiański
 Karl Hagenauer

Some artists from other cities and countries, like Max Liebermann from Berlin or Auguste Rodin and Eugène Grasset from Paris were made corresponding members.

See also
 Secession (art)
 Facing the Modern: The Portrait in Vienna 1900 – the exhibition in National Gallery, London, 2013,
 Art Nouveau
 Art Nouveau in Poland
 Art Nouveau glass art

References

Bibliography
 Arnanson, Harvard H. "History of Modern Art". Ed. Daniel Wheeler. 3rd ed. Englewood Cliffs, NJ: Prentice Hall, Inc, 1986. .
 Borsi, Franco, and Ezio Godoli. "Vienna 1900 Architecture and Design". New York, NY: Rizzoli International Publications, Inc, 1986. 
 "Architecture in Austria in the 20th and 21st Centuries". Ed. Gudrun Hausegger. Basel, SW: Birkhauser, 2006. 
 
 
 O'Connor, Anne-Marie (2012). The Lady in Gold, The Extraordinary Tale of Gustav Klimt's Masterpiece, Portrait of Adele Bloch-Bauer, Alfred A. Knopf, New York, .
 Kathrin Romberg (ed.): Maurizio Cattelan. Text by Francesco Bonami, Wiener Secession, Wien. 
 Schorske, Carl E. "Gustav Klimt: Painting and the Crisis of the Liberal Ego" in Fin-de-Siècle Vienna: Politics and Culture. Vintage Books, 1981. 
 
 Sekler, Eduard F. "Josef Hoffmann The Architectural Work". Princeton, NJ: Princeton UP, 1985. 
 Topp, Leslie. "Architecture and truth in fin-de-siecle vienna". Cambridge, UK: Cambridge UP, 2004.

External links

 Association of Visual Artists Vienna Secession
Graphic design of the Vienna Secession
 iKlimt.com, Life and Work of Gustav Klimt
 Exhibition catalogues of the Vienna Secession in the digital library of Belvedere, Vienna
 Josef Hoffmann Biografie at WOKA (de/en)
 Wiener Werkstaette
 Arts and Crafts in Vienna 1900
 Senses: Vienna Secession
 The Vienna Secession in a video-portrait by CastYourArt, Vienna 2011
 "This Kiss to the Whole World" Klimt and the Vienna Secession (NYARC)

 
Austrian artist groups and collectives
19th-century art groups
Central European art groups
1897 establishments in Austria
Art Nouveau
Austrian art
Artist-run centres
1897 in art